Everyday Is Distortion is the third studio album by Christ Analogue, released on August 15, 2003, by Flagrant Records.

Track listing

Personnel
Adapted from the Everyday Is Distortion liner notes.

Christ Analogue
 Wade Alin – lead vocals, programming, production, mixing
 Markus Von Prause – synthesizer, vocals

Additional musicians
 Charlie Lormé – drum programming
 Joe Schill – programming

Production and design
 Immaculate – cover art
 Shawn McClough – photography

Release history

References

External links 
 Everyday Is Distortion at Bandcamp
 Everyday Is Distortion at Discogs (list of releases)

2003 albums
Christ Analogue albums
Albums produced by Wade Alin